Bamberger is a Bavarian and Southern German toponymic surname, and it indicates someone from Bamberg in Bavaria. Notable people with the surname include:

 Ana Maria Bamberger (born 1966), Romanian physician and playwright
 Ármin Vámbéry (born Bamberger) (1832–1913), Hungarian orientalist
 Bernard Jacob Bamberger (1904-1980), American rabbi and Biblical scholar
 Cyril Stanley Bamberger (1919–2008), Battle of Britain pilot 
 Eugen Bamberger (1857–1932), German chemist
 Florence E. Bamberger (1882–1965), American pedagogue
 Fritz Bamberger (painter) (1814–1873), German painter
 Fritz Bamberger (scholar) (1902–1984), German Jewish scholar
 Heinrich von Bamberger, Austrian physician
 George Bamberger (1923–2004), American baseball player
 Jakob Bamberger (1913–1989), German boxer and Porajmos survivor
 Lesley Bamberger (born 1965/1966), Dutch billionaire, owner of Kroonenberg Groep
 Louis Bamberger (1855-1944), founder of the Institute for Advanced Study
 Bamberger's, retail store that he founded
 Ludwig Bamberger (1823–1899), German deputy, political economist and founder of Deutsche Bank
 Michael Bamberger (born 1960), writer
 Seligman Baer Bamberger (1807–1878), German rabbi, author and educator
 Simon Bamberger (1846–1926), U.S. politician, governor of Utah (1917–1921)

Bamberger may also refer to a citizen of the German city of Bamberg or to organisations connected with that city:

 Bamberg Symphony Orchestra (Bamberger Symphoniker)

See also 
 Bamberg (disambiguation)
 Bambrzy

German-language surnames
de:Bamberger